Ideas in Motion (IM) was a left-wing political party in San Marino.

History
The party was established in 1998 by Alessandro Rossi as a successor to the Democratic Movement, which had won two seats in the 1993 elections. It contested the elections later that year in an alliance with the Sammarinese Democratic Progressive Party (PPDS) and the Democratic Convention. The alliance received 18.6% of the vote, winning 11 of the 60 seats in the Grand and General Council, becoming the third-largest faction.

In 2001 it merged with the PPDS and Socialists for Reform to form the Party of Democrats.

References

Defunct political parties in San Marino
Political parties established in 1998
1998 establishments in San Marino
Political parties disestablished in 2001
2001 disestablishments in San Marino